Barb Thomas Whitehead (born January 22, 1961) is an American professional golfer who played on the LPGA Tour.

Career
She played under both her maiden name, Barb Thomas, and her married name, Barb Whitehead (since 1995). Thomas was a three-time winner of the Iowa State Women's Amateur. She started playing golf at the age of 8 with the mentoring of her father. Whitehead credits her parents as being influential figures in her life and as having helped build her career

Whitehead won once on the LPGA Tour in 1995.

On May 21, 2011, Whitehead was inducted into the Iowa Golf Hall of Fame.

Amateur wins
1979 Iowa State Women's Amateur
1981 Iowa State Women's Amateur
1982 Iowa State Women's Amateur

Professional wins

LPGA Tour wins (1)

LPGA Tour playoff record (0–1)

References

External links

American female golfers
Iowa State Cyclones women's golfers
Tulsa Golden Hurricane women's golfers
LPGA Tour golfers
Golfers from Iowa
People from Sibley, Iowa
1961 births
Living people